A Glass of Rage is a Brazilian drama movie made in 1999. It is the first feature film directed by Aluizio Abranches. The screenplay is based on the work of the Brazilian writer Raduan Nassar.

It premiered at the Berlin International Film Festival and was positively received. It was also well-acclaimed in Brazil, thought it received some criticism with its explicit sex scenes. The movie was launched in many countries, such as Italy, where it remained on screen for a whole year.

The film stars Júlia Lemmertz, Alexandre Borges, Marieta Severo, Ruth de Souza, and Lineu Dias as Júlia’s father.

Cast
Alexandre Borges
Julia Lemmertz
Lineu Dias
Ruth de Souza
Marieta Severo

Release
It received six nominations at the 1st Grande Prêmio Cinema Brasil, of which it did not won any award. A Glass of Rage was screened in the Discovery section of the 24th Toronto International Film Festival and in the Panorama section of the 49th Berlin International Film Festival. Havana Film Festival, Washington, DC International Film Festival, Chicago Latino Film Festival, Amiens International Film Festival, and Galway International Oyster Festival also screened it.

References

External links

1999 films
1999 drama films
Brazilian drama films
Films based on Brazilian novels
Films directed by Aluizio Abranches
Films shot in Rio de Janeiro (city)
1990s Portuguese-language films
1999 directorial debut films